Fatmir Hasanpapa (born 19 April 1965) is an Albanian retired footballer, who played as a midfielder for Partizani Tirana and later in Germany.

Club career
Hasanpapa played for Partizani in the 1991–92 European Cup Winners' Cup game against Dutch giants Feyenoord in Rotterdam and decided not to return to communist Albania after the match, but to leave for Germany where he played for Erkelenz, Kückhoven and Wegberg. He later surfaced at SC Jülich, where he became subject of a TV documentary. At 42, he still played for fellow German amateur side SC Rheindahlen.

International career
He made his debut for Albania in an April 1989 FIFA World Cup qualification match against England, which proved to be his sole international game. He started that game after Mirel Josa was out injured.

Honours
Albanian Superliga: 1
 1987

References

External links

 Profile - SC Wegberg

1965 births
Living people
Association football midfielders
Albanian footballers
Albania international footballers
FK Partizani Tirana players
FC Wegberg-Beeck players
SC Jülich players
Kategoria Superiore players
Albanian expatriate footballers
Expatriate footballers in Germany
Albanian expatriate sportspeople in Germany
Albanian defectors